Micrambe, is a genus of beetles belonging to the family Cryptophagidae. The genus contains more than 45 species. Six species are known from Madagascar and Réunion. About 23 species are known from South Africa.

Species
 Micrambe abietis
 Micrambe africana
 Micrambe alluaudi
 Micrambe angulata
 Micrambe anguliformis
 Micrambe apicalis
 Micrambe basuto
 Micrambe brevitarsis
 Micrambe brincki
 Micrambe caffer
 Micrambe camerunensis
 Micrambe capensis
 Micrambe consors
 Micrambe danielssoni
 Micrambe endroedyi
 Micrambe grouvellei
 Micrambe hanstroemi
 Micrambe helichrysi
 Micrambe hirta
 Micrambe johnstoni
 Micrambe kolbei
 Micrambe leonardoi
 Micrambe loebli
 Micrambe madagascariensis
 Micrambe mediterranica
 Micrambe micoae
 Micrambe minuta
 Micrambe modesta
 Micrambe natalensis
 Micrambe nigrothoracica
 Micrambe oblonga
 Micrambe peringueyi
 Micrambe plagiata
 Micrambe quadricollis
 Micrambe reuninensis
 Micrambe sarnensis† 
 Micrambe similis
 Micrambe simoni
 Micrambe turneri
 Micrambe ulicis
 Micrambe woodroffei

References

External links
 Three new species and distributional records of Micrambe C.G. Thomson, 1863 and Cryptophagus Herbst, 1792 (Coleoptera: Cryptophagidae) from Israel and Turkey
 The genera Micrambe Thomson, 1863 and Cryptophagus Herbst, 1792 (Coleoptera: Cryptophagidae) in the Canary Islands.

Cryptophagidae